Red Band Society is an American teen medical comedy-drama television series, developed by Margaret Nagle, that aired on Fox for the 2014–15 American television season. The series premiered on September 17, 2014.

Based on the Catalan drama series Polseres vermelles, the series focuses on a group of teenagers living together as patients in a hospital's pediatric ward.

On November 26, 2014, it was confirmed the show would stop production after its original 13-episode order, and the show was pulled from the schedule after episode 10.

On January 13, 2015, it was announced that the show was officially canceled, and the final three episodes of the series would air starting on January 31 and ending on February 7, 2015, with a two-hour finale.

Cast and characters

Main 
 Octavia Spencer as Dena Jackson, the strict and seemingly scary head nurse overseeing the pediatric facility. 
 Dave Annable as Dr. Adam McAndrew, a handsome skilled surgeon working at the hospital and an ex-fiancé of Dr. Erin Grace. 
 Ciara Bravo as Emma Chota, an intelligent patient with anorexia, who is also the girlfriend of Leo and the love interest of Jordi.
 Griffin Gluck as Charles "Charlie" Hutchison, a young comatose patient in the pediatrics ward who is also the narrator of the series.
 Zoe Levin as Kara Souders, a high school cheerleader with an enlarged heart who is at the bottom of the transplant recipient list due to her drug abuse. She is the love interest of Hunter.
 Rebecca Rittenhouse as Brittany Dobler, a new, ambitious, and cheerful nurse. She has a one-night stand with Dr. McAndrew.
 Charlie Rowe as Leo Roth, an amputee and former osteosarcoma patient who is undergoing rehabilitation. He serves as the unofficial leader of the Red Band Society which he created himself. He is in love with Emma and dated her, on and off. 
 Nolan Sotillo as Jordi Palacios, a patient with Ewing sarcoma who is newly admitted to the pediatrics ward. He has a crush on Emma. 
 Astro as Dashiell "Dash" Hosney, a patient with cystic fibrosis who tries to impress girls. He is best friends with Leo.

Recurring 
 Wilson Cruz as Kenji Gomez-Rejon, a nurse.
 Daren Kagasoff as Hunter Cole, a leukemia survivor who now suffers from cirrhosis and is in need of a liver transplant. He is Kara's love interest.
 Thomas Ian Nicholas as Nick Hutchison, Charlie's father.
 Susan Park as Mandy Hutchison, Charlie's mother.
 Adrian Lester as Dr. Larry Naday, a famous British neurologist who is brought in to help Charlie and becomes the love interest of Dena.
 Mandy Moore as Dr. Erin Grace, McAndrew's ex-fiancée.
 Griffin Dunne as Ruben Garcia, an older hypochondria patient.
 Catalina Sandino Moreno as Eva Palacios, Jordi's mother
 Andrea Parker as Sarah Souders, Kara's mother.
 Tricia O'Kelley as Daniella, Kara's step-mother and former nanny.
 Nicolas Bechtel as younger Jordi Palacios.
 Jes Macallan as Ashley Cole, Hunter's sister. 
 Jessica Lu as Mae, Dash's online girlfriend who also has cystic fibrosis.
 Rebecca McFarland as Sylvia Roth, Leo's mother.
 John Allen Nelson as Jon Chota, Emma's father.
 Marin Hinkle as Caroline Chota, Emma's mother, whom Emma hasn't had a good relationship with since her diagnosis.
 Bertila Damas as Alma Quintana Leon, Jordi's grandmother, whom he grew up with in Mexico.

Guest stars 
Kennedy Brice as Finley Chota, Emma's (Ciara Bravo) little sister. 
Bella Thorne as Delaney Shaw, a troubled teen pop star who is in the hospital for rehab. She later almost has sex with Dash, who already had an online girlfriend, Mae.

Development 
A remake of Polseres vermelles, known in English as The Red Band Society, was originally developed for ABC in 2011 by Friends co-creator Marta Kauffman, but the network chose to not move forward after first production stages. In November 2013, Fox announced a new project to bring an adaptation of the Catalan television show in the United States held by Warm Springs and Boardwalk Empire writer Margaret Nagle. On January 17, 2014, the project received a pilot order, plus additional backup scripts.

On May 6, 2014, Fox picked up the pilot with a series order for the 2014–15 season.

On January 13, 2015 the series was cancelled by Fox.

Episodes

Reception
On Rotten Tomatoes, the show holds a rating of 58%, based on 48 reviews, but a rating of 40% based on its 25 Top Critics. The site's consensus reads, "Its premise may be questionable and its light-hearted tone is occasionally overbearing, but Red Band Society succeeds on the strength of its young characters." On Metacritic, the show has a score of 58 out of 100, based on 36 critics, indicating "mixed or average reviews".

Ratings

Broadcast
In Australia the series premiered from August 26, 2015, on the Seven Network at 12:30am.

References

External links 
 

2010s American comedy-drama television series
2010s American medical television series
2010s American teen drama television series
2014 American television series debuts
2015 American television series endings
American television series based on Spanish television series
English-language television shows
Fox Broadcasting Company original programming
Television series by ABC Studios
Television series by Amblin Entertainment
Television shows filmed in Atlanta
Television shows set in Atlanta
Television shows about eating disorders
Works about cystic fibrosis